Ebenezer N. Briggs (November 1, 1801 – January 26, 1873) was an American lawyer and politician in the U.S. state of Vermont. He served as the Speaker of the Vermont House of Representatives and as President Pro Tem of the Vermont Senate. He was also the father-in-law and law partner of Governor Ebenezer J. Ormsbee.

Early life
Briggs was born in Middleboro, Massachusetts on November 1, 1801. He was raised and educated in Salisbury, Vermont, studied law, and began to practice law in Salisbury in 1823. He later practiced in Pittsford and Brandon. For several years he served as Addison County State's Attorney.  John Prout, later a Justice of the Vermont Supreme Court, studied law at Briggs' direction and became Briggs' partner after attaining admission to the bar.

For many years Briggs was the attorney for the Rutland Railroad, and also served as an officer and director of the Brandon National Bank. For several years he practiced in partnership with Ebenezer J. Ormsbee, who served as Vermont Governor from 1886-1888.

Political career
Originally a Whig and later a Republican, Briggs served several terms in the Vermont House of Representatives and was Speaker from 1834-1836 and from 1845-1847. He also served several terms in the Vermont Senate. From 1843-1844 he was Senate President Pro Tem.

Briggs died in Brandon on January 26, 1873.

Family life
Briggs was the father of Jennie L. Briggs (February 1, 1841 – June 1, 1866), the first wife of Governor E. J. Ormsbee.

References

1801 births
1873 deaths
People from Middleborough, Massachusetts
People from Salisbury, Vermont
People from Brandon, Vermont
Vermont lawyers
State's attorneys in Vermont
Vermont Whigs
19th-century American politicians
Republican Party members of the Vermont House of Representatives
Speakers of the Vermont House of Representatives
Vermont state senators
Presidents pro tempore of the Vermont Senate
19th-century American lawyers